Salim Keddar (born 23 November 1993) is an Algerian middle-distance runner competing primarily in the 1500 metres. He represented his country at the 2015 World Championships in Beijing without advancing from the first round. In addition, he won the bronze medal at the 2015 African Games.

Competition record

Personal bests
Outdoor
1500 metres – 3:35.92 (Algiers 2015)
3000 metres steeplechase – 8:39.32 (Algiers 2014)

References

Living people
1993 births
Place of birth missing (living people)
Algerian male middle-distance runners
Algerian male steeplechase runners
World Athletics Championships athletes for Algeria
Athletes (track and field) at the 2015 African Games
Athletes (track and field) at the 2016 Summer Olympics
Olympic athletes of Algeria
African Games bronze medalists for Algeria
African Games medalists in athletics (track and field)
Athletes (track and field) at the 2022 Mediterranean Games
Mediterranean Games competitors for Algeria
21st-century Algerian people